The 2020–21 season was Antalyaspor's 55th season in existence and the club's sixth consecutive season in the top flight of Turkish football. In addition to the domestic league, Antalyaspor participated in this season's edition of the Turkish Cup. The season covered the period from  30 July 2020 to 30 June 2021.

Kits 
Supplier: Kappa / Main sponsor: Regnum / Sleeve sponsor: Corendon Airlines / Back sponsor: Anex Tour / Short sponsor: Adopen / Socks sponsor: 7 Mehmet

Players

First-team squad

Out on loan

Transfers

In

Out

Pre-season and friendlies

Pre-season

Mid-season

Competitions

Overview

Süper Lig

League table

Results summary

Results by round

Matches

Turkish Cup

Statistics

Goalscorers

References

External links

Antalyaspor seasons
Antalyaspor